C25 or C-25 may refer to:

Vehicles 
Aircraft
 Boeing C-25, an American airliner operated as Air Force One
 Caudron C.25, a French biplane
 Cierva C.25, a British autogyro
 Lockheed C-25 Altair, an American military transport

Automobiles
 BSA C25 Barracuda, a British motorcycle
 Carlsson C25, a German supercar
 Citroën C25, a French van

Ships and boats
 Catalina 25, an American sailboat
 , a C-class submarine of the Royal Navy

Other uses 
 C-25 highway (Spain), in Catalonia
 C25 road (Namibia)
 Caldwell 25, a globular cluster
 OMX Copenhagen 25, an index on the Copenhagen Stock Exchange
 Pancreatic cancer
 Siemens C25, a mobile phone
 Vienna Game, a chess opening
 Waverly Municipal Airport, in Waverly, Iowa
 Isolate C25 of the bacterium Acidithrix ferrooxidans
 C25 gas, a gaseous mixture of 75% Argon and 25% Carbon Dioxide, commonly used in MIG welding.